William Yabeun (born March 15, 1987) is a Cameroon football player who currently plays for Ethiopian Coffee F.C. in the Ethiopian Premier League.

Club career
On June 30, 2011, Yabeun signed a three-year contract with JSM Béjaïa of the Algerian Ligue Professionnelle 1, replacing compatriot Yannick N'Djeng.

International career
Yabeun has represented Cameroon at the Under-20 and Under-23 level.

References

External links
 

1987 births
Living people
Footballers from Yaoundé
Algerian Ligue Professionnelle 1 players
Cameroonian footballers
Cameroonian expatriate footballers
Expatriate footballers in Algeria
Expatriate footballers in Ethiopia
JSM Béjaïa players
Cameroonian expatriate sportspeople in Algeria
Cameroon under-20 international footballers
WA Tlemcen players
Association football forwards